is a velodrome located in Tachikawa, Tokyo that conducts pari-mutuel Keirin racing - one of Japan's four authorized  where gambling is permitted. Its Keirin identification number for betting purposes is 28# (28 sharp).

Tachikawa's oval is 400 meters in circumference. A typical keirin race of 2,025 meters consists of five laps around the course.

The Tokyo-based Tachikawa is one of professional keirin racing's major velodromes, often hosting its biggest race, the Keirin Grand Prix.

External links
Tachikawa Keirin Home Page (Japanese)
keirin.jp Tachikawa Information (Japanese)

Velodromes in Japan
Cycle racing in Japan
Sports venues in Tokyo
Tachikawa, Tokyo